Aleksandr Shilin (born February 2, 1976) is a Russian-born Kyrgyzstani former swimmer, who specialized in middle-distance freestyle and sprint backstroke events. He represented his adopted nation Kyrgyzstan at the 2000 Summer Olympics, and posted top-ten times in 50 m backstroke from the European and Russian Swimming Masters.

Shilin competed in two relay swimming events at the 2000 Summer Olympics in Sydney. On the fourth day of the Games, Shilin, along with Andrei Pakin, Ivan Ivanov, and Dmitri Kuzmin, were disqualified from heat one for an early takeoff during the lead-off leg. Three days later, in the 4×100 m medley relay, Shilin teamed up with Russian imports Alexander Tkachev, Konstantin Ushkov, and Sergey Ashihmin. Leading off the backstroke leg in the same heat, he recorded a split of 57.88, but a diverse Kyrgyzstan team settled for seventh place and nineteenth overall in a final time of 3:46.70.

References

1976 births
Living people
Kyrgyzstani male backstroke swimmers
Russian male backstroke swimmers
Olympic swimmers of Kyrgyzstan
Swimmers at the 2000 Summer Olympics
Kyrgyzstani male freestyle swimmers
Swimmers from Saint Petersburg
Russian emigrants to Kyrgyzstan
Kyrgyzstani people of Russian descent
Russian male freestyle swimmers